Litti Chokha is a 2021 Bhojpuri-language drama film directed by Parag Patil and produced by Pradeep K Sharma under banner of "Baba Motion Pictures Pvt Ltd" with co-produced by Anita Sharma and Padam Singh. The film features Khesari Lal Yadav and Kajal Raghwani in the lead role, with Manoj Tiger, Padam Singh, Pragati Bhatt, Dev Singh, Karan Pandey, Priti Singh, Shruti Rao, Prakash Jais, and Vikash Singh Virappan appearing in supporting roles.

The film was released on 9 April 2021 in all theatres.

Cast
 Khesari Lal Yadav
 Kajal Raghwani
 Manoj Tiger
 Padam Singh
 Pragati Bhatt
 Dev Singh
 Karan Pandey
 Priti Singh
 Shruti Rao
 Prakash Jais
 Vikash Singh Virappan

Music
Music of this film was composed by Om Jha, Manjesh Chaurasiya and Madhukar Anand and lyrics written by Kundan Preet, Pyare Lal Yadav, Shyam Dehati, Yadav Raj, Uma Lal Yadav, Ashutosh Tiwari and Tun Tun Yadav. Background music scored by Chandrashekhar.

References

Indian drama films
2021 films
2020s Bhojpuri-language films
2021 drama films